Şebnem Paker (born 20 July 1977) is a Turkish guitarist, singer and music teacher.

Biography
She attended the Department of Classical Guitar at Istanbul University State Conservatory between 1992 and 1996. Later, she studied singing at Marmara University Music Department.

Paker represented Turkey in the Eurovision Song Contest 1996 and Eurovision Song Contest 1997. Her entry in 1997, the song "Dinle", composed by Levent Çoker and written by Mehtap Alnıtemiz, achieved a 3rd-place result, Turkey's best result in the contest until their first win in 2003. She released her only album, also called Dinle, in August 1997.

In 1998, she once again competed in the national final organized by TRT and expressed the idea to achieve a more successful result at the Eurovision Song Contest every year. However, she could not achieve the success she aimed for, with the song titled "Çal". It was thought to attract the attention of European audiences with its moving melody embellished with ethnic Turkish instruments she used, but did not gain the right to represent Turkey at the Eurovision Song Contest that year.

She graduated from Marmara University Music Education Singing Department in 2000. She has been working as a music teacher since 2004, after working for 4 years in private educational institutions affiliated to the Ministry of National Education. She was teaching music at Avni Akyol Fine Arts High School in Istanbul until 2018  and has been employed at the Aydın Doğan Fine Arts High School since 2018. She has also coauthored a textbook to be used in art high schools in Turkey.

Paker has been married to Soner Odabaş since 22 September 2012 and the couple has two children.

References

1977 births
Living people
Turkish women singers
Turkish pop singers
Musicians from Istanbul
Eurovision Song Contest entrants for Turkey
Eurovision Song Contest entrants of 1996
Eurovision Song Contest entrants of 1997
Istanbul University alumni